Underdale may refer to the following places: 

 Underdale, Shrewsbury, Shropshire, England 
 Underdale, South Australia, Australia 
 Underdale High School
 Kirby Underdale, North Yorkshire, England